The 1998 Honda Indy 300 was the eighteenth and penultimate round of the 1998 CART World Series Season, held on 18 October 1998 on the Surfers Paradise Street Circuit, Surfers Paradise, Queensland, Australia. Alex Zanardi won the race, his 15th and final CART victory, after taking the lead from polesitter Dario Franchitti at the first round of pitstops.

Qualifying results

Classification

Race

Caution flags

Lap Leaders

Point standings after race

References 

Honda Indy 300
Honda Indy 300
Gold Coast Indy 300